FC Mayak Valky is an amateur football club from Valky, Ukraine.

History
The club was established in 1958 as Mayak (Lighthouse) and sponsored by the Shevchenko Kharkiv Instrument Factory. Mayak competed in the Soviet Second League and Soviet Second League B. After the fall of the Soviet Union the club was transferred on the balance of the local school of Olympic Reserve and therefore changed its name accordingly. Entering the Ukrainian competitions Olympik relegated out of the professional level competitions and dissolved.

In 2016 it was reorganized as a sports school (school of physical culture).

Honours
Kharkiv Oblast Football Championship
Winners (4): 1967, 1968, 1969, 1970 (all as Mayak Kharkiv)

League and cup history

{|class="wikitable"
|-bgcolor="#efefef"
! Season
! Div.
! Pos.
! Pl.
! W
! D
! L
! GS
! GA
! P
!Domestic Cup
!colspan=2|Europe
!Notes
|-
|align=center|1992
|align=center|3rd
|align=center|6
|align=center|16
|align=center|5
|align=center|5
|align=center|6
|align=center|23
|align=center|26
|align=center|15
|align=center|
|align=center|
|align=center|
|align=center bgcolor=red|Relegated
|-
|align=center|1992–93
|align=center|4th
|align=center|15
|align=center|34
|align=center|7
|align=center|10
|align=center|17
|align=center|35
|align=center|56
|align=center|24
|align=center|
|align=center|
|align=center|
|align=center bgcolor=red|Relegated
|}

See also
 FC Metalist Kharkiv
 FC Helios Kharkiv
 FC Kharkiv
 Kharkiv State College of Physical Culture 1

External links
 UFC Olimpik Kharkiv. official website

 
1958 establishments in Ukraine
Olympik Kharkiv
Kharkiv State College of Physical Culture 1
Amateur football clubs in Ukraine